Max Halbe (4 October 1865 – 30 November 1944) was a German dramatist and main exponent of Naturalism.

Biography
Halbe was born at the manor of Güttland (Koźliny) near Danzig (Gdańsk), where he grew up. He was a member of an old family of peasants who had immigrated two centuries earlier from Westphalia. He attended the gymnasium (secondary school) at Marienburg. In 1883 he began his study of law at the University of Heidelberg. He studied history and Germanic philology at the University of Berlin, 1885–1887. He obtained his doctorate at the University of Munich in 1888.

He then moved to Berlin. In both Berlin and Munich, Halbe became acquainted with the leaders of the new naturalistic movement in German literature, and became associated with the Free Stage movement in 1889. He was strongly influenced by the association with, and the works of, Johannes Schlaf and Arno Holt. In the spring of 1890, he wrote the play Free Love, later called Ein Verhältnis (1895). He married the same year. Halbe was not entirely in accord with the Freie Bühne, and with consistent naturalism (see Gerhart Hauptmann), as the latter deviated considerably from his own tendencies.

He published Eisgang in 1892, and then his primary work, Jugend (Youth), in 1893, which was, after Hauptmann's Die Weber, the most successful contemporary stage play in Germany. It was difficult for him to get Eisgang and Jugend performed, although Jugend got a performance on the Freie Volksbühne in 1892. Jugend was especially difficult to place:  famous theatre managers in Berlin (L'Arronge, Barnay, Blumenthal) refused it, but Lautenburg accepted and performed it with great success in 1893. The drama, whose unaffected and sympathetic treatment of sexual relationships made no concessions to prevailing bourgeois morality, won it the enthusiastic praise of socialist critics. Franz Mehring, the principal spokesman of the Social Democratic Party of Germany on culture, warmly welcomed Jugend and referred to Halbe, along with Gerhardt Hauptmann, as "one of the princes of Genius land." In 1917 an operatic version of Jugend, composed by Ignatz Waghalter, was premiered in Berlin at the Deutsches Opernhaus (now known as the Deutsche Oper) to great acclaim.

Halbe's next play, the comedy The Tourist in America made the impression of being witless, and his reputation rapidly declined. Constant laments were uttered by critics as to his failure to fulfill the promise of his early work. Halbe decided to move to the rural atmosphere of  Kreuzlingen, on Lake Constance, in 1894.

In 1895 Halbe went to Munich again, where, with Josef Ruederer, he founded the Intimate Theater for Dramatic Experiments,  in which writers and poets appeared on the stage, and was a co-founder of Munich Popular Theatre. As a member of the Munich artist society, his circle included Otto Erich Hartleben, Frank Wedekind, Hanns von Gumppenberg, Ludwig Thoma and Eduard von Keyserling.

He began writing again. The dramas Lebenswende and Mutter Erde (the latter standing with Jugend as his most famous work; a translation into English, Mother Earth, appeared in German Classics, Vol. XX, New York, 1914) and the novelle Frau Mesek are of this period.

When the National Socialists seized power in January 1933, Halbe, like Gerhart Hauptmann, did not openly speak against them, and held aloof from politics. But on 22 October 1933, he signed a statement of loyalty to Adolf Hitler. As one of the few writers of significance that remained in Germany, the Nazis used him for advertising, which after the war damaged his reputation, and led to widespread rejection of his work.

In 1933 and 1935 his biography Scholle und Schicksal and Jahrhundertwende were published. Halbe died in the age of 79 at his manor house in Neuötting, Bavaria.

Works 
 Ein Emporkömmling (1889)
 Freie Liebe, drama (1890)
 Der Eisgang, drama (1892)
 Jugend, drama (1893)
 Der Amerikafahrer, comedy (1894)
 Lebenswende (1896)
 Mutter Erde, drama (1897)
 Der Eroberer (1898)
 Die Heimatlosen (1899)
 Das Tausendjährige Reich, drama (1899)
 Haus Rosenhagen, drama (1901)
 Walpurgistag (1902)
 Der Strom, drama (1904)
 Die Insel der Seligen (1905)
 Das wahre Gesicht (1907)
 Blaue Berge, comedy (1909)
 Der Ring des Gauklers, play (1911)
 Die Tat des Dietrich Stobäus, novel (1911)
 Freiheit. Ein Schauspiel von 1812 (1913)
 Schloß Zeitvorbei, dramatic legend (1917)
 Die Traumgesichte des Adam Thor, play (1929)
 Generalkonsul Stenzel und sein gefährliches Ich, novel (1931)
 Heinrich von Plauen, drama (1933)
 Scholle und Schicksal. Geschichte meines Lebens, autobiography (1933)
 Jahrhundertwende. Geschichte meines Lebens 1893-1914, autobiography (1935)
 Erntefest (1936)
 Die Elixiere des Glücks, novel (1936)
 Kaiser Friedrich II (1940)
 Jo, novel (1917)

Notes

References 
 Josef Egginger: Der Dichter Max Halbe im Öttinger Land. In: Oettinger Land, Altötting. 15 (1995). S. 127–135.
 Ulrich Erdmann: Vom Naturalismus zum Nationalsozialismus? Zeitgeschichtlich-biographische Studien zu Max Halbe, Gerhart Hauptmann, Johannes Schlaf und Hermann Stehr. Mit unbekannten Selbstzeugnissen. 	Frankfurt am Main u.a.: Lang, 1997. 
 Andreas Lothar Günter: Präfaschistische Weltanschauung im Werk Max Halbes. Frankfurt am Main u.a.: Lang, 2002. (= Europäische Hochschulschriften; Reihe 1, Deutsche Sprache und Literatur; 1841) 
 Joachim Kalcher: Perspektiven des Lebens in der Dramatik um 1900. Köln u.a.: Boehlau, 1980. (= Kölner germanistische Studien; 14) 
 Heinz Kindermann: Max Halbe und der deutsche Osten. Danzig: Rosenberg, 1941. (= Danzig in Geschichte und Gegenwart; 4)
 Werner Kleine: Max Halbes Stellung zum Naturalismus innerhalb der ersten beiden Dezennien seines dramatischen Schaffens. (1887-1900). Zeulenroda: Sporn,1937.
 Peter Oliver Loew: "Die Heimat sucht den Dichter – der Dichter sucht die Heimat. Max Halbe und Danzig". In Das literarische und kulturelle Erbe von Danzig und Gdańsk, hrsg. v. Andrzej Kątny, Frankfurt am Main (u.a.) 2004,  (Danziger Beiträge zur Germanistik, Bd. 15). 
 Stadtbibliothek München (Hrsg.): Max Halbe zum 100. Geburtstag. München: Lehle, 1965.
 Thorsten Stegemann: Literatur im Abseits. Studien zu ausgewählten Werken von Rainer Maria Rilke, Hermann Sudermann, Max Halbe, Gottfried Benn und Erich Kästner. Stuttgart: Ibidem-Verlag, 2000. 
 Karl Ude: "Max Halbes Nachlass. Ein Münchner Spiegel der Jahrhundertwende". In: Schwabing von innen. München 2002. S. 45–54.
 Herbert Weder: Die Stimmungskunst in Max Halbes Gegenwartsdramen unter bes. Berücksichtigung Ibsens. Ein Beitrag zur Theorie und Geschichte des Dramas um 1900. Würzburg: Werkbund. 1932.
 Friedrich Zillmann: Max Halbe. Wesen und Werk. Würzburg/Main: Holzner, 1959. (= Der Göttinger Arbeitskreis; Schriftenreihe; 62)

External links 
 Biography (German)

1862 births
1944 deaths
People from Gdańsk County
People from the Province of Prussia
19th-century German novelists
20th-century German novelists
German male short story writers
German short story writers
German poets
German male poets
German male novelists
German male dramatists and playwrights
19th-century German dramatists and playwrights
20th-century German dramatists and playwrights
19th-century German short story writers
19th-century German male writers
20th-century German short story writers
20th-century German male writers